Bada (also Badaʼ) is an Austronesian language spoken in the South Lore district of Central Sulawesi, Indonesia. Together with Napu and Behoa, it belongs to the Badaic subgroup.

Grammar
Bada has the following pronoun sets:

References

Kaili–Pamona languages
Languages of Sulawesi